Toxonevra muliebris is a species of flutter fly in the family Pallopteridae. It has been found in Europe and North America. The pattern on the wings of this species is distinctive.

Taxonomy 
This species was first described by Moses Harris under the name Musca muliebris.  Subsequently, this species has been included within the genus Palloptera. It has also been known under the name Toxoneura muliebris. However this name is regarded as being a misspelling of the genus Toxonevra. It is currently known as Toxonevra muliebris.

Description 

Morris described this species as follows:

The pattern on the wings of adults is distinctive and is a diagnostic feature when identifying this species.

Distribution 
This species is native to Europe, and has been observed in countries such as Spain, Italy, Austria, France, Belgium, Great Britain and Ireland. Recently it has been observed and collected in North America.

Ecology 
The larvae of this species has been found under tree bark and it has been hypothesised that they feed on beetle larvae. In North America adults of this species have also been discovered inside residential houses. It has been suggested that this is as a result of larvae of T. mulibris preferring to prey on the larvae of carpet beetles, a common household pest in North America.

References 

Pallopteridae
Insects described in 1780
Muscomorph flies of Europe